Abdrazakov is a Russian masculine surname, its feminine counterpart is Abdrazakova. It may refer to
Elmira Abdrazakova (born 1994), Kazakhstani-Russian model
Igor Abdrazakov (born 1978), Russian football player
Ildar Abdrazakov (born 1976), Russian opera singer

Russian-language surnames